Powell Frederick Carter Jr. (June 3, 1931 – June 28, 2017) was a United States Navy four star admiral who served as Director of the Joint Staff 1985–1987, United States Military Representative, NATO Military Committee (USMILREP) from 1987 to 1988; and as Commander in Chief, United States Atlantic Fleet (CINCLANTFLT) from 1988 to 1991. He died at the age of 86 in 2017.

Notes

United States Navy admirals
United States Naval Academy alumni
1931 births
2017 deaths
Recipients of the Legion of Merit
Recipients of the Defense Superior Service Medal